George Alfred Ford, born 1851 in Aleppo, died 1928 in Sidon, was an American Presbyterian missionary.

His father had been a missionary in Syria, and his grandfather, Colonel Mahlon Ford, a member of Washington's staff in the American Revolution.

Ford was educated at Williams College and the Union Presbyterian Seminary, returning to Syria in 1880.

After his education he returned to Syria to work at the Boy's Training School, later the Gerard Institute, and today the National Evangelical Institute for Girls and Boys.

Sources
 Missionary digs up coffins Dr. George A Ford, Chicago Tribune, 09 Sep 1923, p.18
 “3 Americans in Late Nineteenth-Century Syria.” International Migration Review 29, no. 2_suppl (January 1995): 50–78. https://doi.org/10.1177/019791839502902s06.

People from Sidon
American Presbyterian missionaries
Presbyterian missionaries in Syria
Missionary educators

1851 births
1928 deaths